Mohamed Sabry (Arabic:محمد صبري; born 7 April 1974) is an Egyptian football midfielder who played for Zamalek, Kazma and Ittihad Alexandria.

Honours
Zamalek
 Egyptian Premier League: 2001, 2003
 Egypt Cup: 1999, 2002
 Egyptian Super Cup: 2001, 2002
 CAF Champions League: 1996, 2002
 African Cup Winners' Cup: 2000
 CAF Super Cup: 1997
 Afro-Asian Cup: 1997

References

External links
 
 

1974 births
Living people
Egyptian footballers
Egypt international footballers
Egyptian expatriate footballers
Zamalek SC players
Kazma SC players
Al Ittihad Alexandria Club players
Egyptian Premier League players
Association football midfielders
Kuwait Premier League players
Expatriate footballers in Kuwait
Egyptian expatriate sportspeople in Kuwait